Mahakalapada (Sl. No.: 100) is an unreserved Vidhan Sabha constituency of Kendrapara district, Odisha.

This constituency includes Mahakalapada block and 16 Gram panchayats (Silipur, Dasipur, Dumuka, Marshaghai, Garajanga, Talasanga, Parakula, Akhuadakhin, Raghabapur, Antei, Batira, Beruhan, Manikunda, Angulai, Kuhudi and Mangarajpur) of Marsaghai block.

Elected members

Elected member from the Mahakalapada constituency is:
2019: (100): Atanu Sabyasachi Nayak (BJD)
2014: (100): Atanu Sabyasachi Nayak (BJD)
2009: (100): Atanu Sabyasachi Nayak (BJD)

2019 Election Results

2014 Election Results

2009 election results
In 2009 election, Biju Janata Dal candidate Atanu Sabyasachi Nayak defeated Indian National Congress candidate Balaram Parida by a margin of 19,595 votes.

Notes

References

Assembly constituencies of Odisha
Kendrapara district